Baranof Warm Springs is a small, primarily seasonally-occupied community located in the city and borough of Sitka, Alaska, on the eastern side of Baranof Island, from which it likely derives its name, in the Alexander Archipelago. It is occasionally referred to simply as Baranof.

Geography
Baranof Warm Springs is located on Warm Springs Bay which is just off of Chatham Strait. Just about a half mile up from the settlement is Baranof Lake, a large glacially-fed freshwater lake. Baranof Lake is fed from small unnamed glacial run-off streams as well as the relatively large Baranof River. Between the half mile outlet between Baranof Lake and Warm Springs Bay there are a series of rapids and waterfalls that have proven to be lethal when run.

Community

Baranof Warm Springs is a very small community, having only caretakers in the winter and intermittent visitors in the summer. There are around 15 seasonal homes. The community lies inside the jurisdiction of the City and Borough of Sitka. Other than property taxes and any dock fees from the new dock (2016) there is only one tax-paying commercial enterprise, the Baranof Wilderness Lodge and Resort. The city, in return, funds maintenance of a boardwalk which serves as the main thoroughfare as well as the dock for transient vessels. The community of property owners (BPOA- Baranof Property Owners Association) pools money together to pay for a seasonal (winter) caretaker for seasonally-inhabited residences, the city-owned picnic shelter (possible shelter for those needing it), the public bath house (which features three separate tubs), and the communal warm springs pools. Another caretaker is hired to tend to the Baranof Lodge from October 1 to May 1 when the owners of the Lodge return.

History
Baranof Warm Springs was used frequently by the Tlingit of Angoon.  People of western descent did not find the springs until 1891.  It was serviced by a post office from 1907 through 1912, under the name of Baranoff.

Demographics

Baranof Warm Springs appeared on the U.S. Census twice as an unincorporated village. First in 1930 as Baranof with 25 residents and as "Baronof" in 1940 with 10 residents. It was later annexed into the City and Borough of Sitka.

Transportation
Baranof Warm Springs is accessible via floatplane with regularly scheduled flights leaving Sitka. The trans-island flight is 30 minutes on a clear day and an hour on an overcast one. The Alaska Marine Highway does not service Baranof Warm Springs and there is no scheduled ferry/marine passenger services to the community. Baranof Warm Springs itself does not feature any roads, and the boardwalk does not accommodate ATVs.

Attractions
The primary attraction is the warm springs. There are a total of nine separate hot springs with temperatures from lukewarm to 120 degrees F. Only one is developed in a natural state and is located right up against the white water of the Baranof River. The community built a public bathhouse at the waterfront to provide an option for visitors not wanting to bathe communally and/or make the 1/4 mile hike up the trail to the natural springs.

Small tour boats come in frequently in the summer, but also fishermen, and employees of the Hidden Falls Hatchery visit as well. The warm springs is also the terminus (or occasionally the trailhead) of the Baranof Cross-Island Trail. On the northern end of Baranof Lake there is also a Forest Service cabin that is quite popular. The cabin can only be reached by boat or float plane. The terrain is too steep to hike.

Baranof Warm Springs is home to the Coastal Research and Education Center, a research base and educational facility operated seasonally by the Alaska Whale Foundation.

See also
Baranof Cross-Island Trail
Baranof Warm Springs (thermal mineral springs)

References

Geography of Sitka, Alaska
Hot springs of Alaska
Bodies of water of Sitka, Alaska